The Shire of Dalwallinu is a local government area in the Wheatbelt region of Western Australia, about  NNE of Perth, the state capital.

History
Initially, the area was part of the Moora and Upper Irwin Road Districts. On 2 June 1916, the Dalwallinu Road District was created. On 1 July 1961, it became a shire following the enactment of the Local Government Act 1960.

Wards
On 14 May 1966, the Shire was divided into four wards: Central, North, South and East Wards, and membership was increased from 9 to 11. On 22 May 1971, a new ward, Dalwallinu Townsite Ward with one councillor, was created and the council reduced back to 9 councillors by allocating 2 each to the original four wards. In 1992, the Central and Dalwallinu Townsite Wards were merged to form the new Central Ward, and on 3 May 2003, the Central and South Wards were merged to form the new South Ward.

As such, the present ward system of the shire is:

 East Ward (two councillors)
 North Ward (two councillors)
 South Ward (six councillors)

Towns and localities
The towns and localities of the Shire of Dalwallinu with population and size figures based on the most recent Australian census:

Population

Heritage-listed places
As of 2023, 81 places are heritage-listed in the Shire of Dalwallinu, of which two are on the State Register of Heritage Places.

References

External links

 

 
Dalwallinu